Labeobarbus gorguari is a threatened species of cyprinid fish. It is restricted to Lake Tana in Ethiopia.

References 

Endemic fauna of Ethiopia
gorguari
Taxa named by Eduard Rüppell
Fish described in 1835
Fish of Lake Tana